"Ipséité" is a song by Belgian rapper Damso released in 2018.

Charts

References

2018 songs
2018 singles
French-language Belgian songs